Glycosmis macrantha is a tree of Borneo in the family Rutaceae. The specific epithet  is from the Greek meaning "large flower".

Description
The large flowers are whitish in colour.

Distribution and habitat
Glycosmis macrantha is endemic to Borneo. Its habitat is forests, and sometimes in disturbed habitats, from sea-level to  altitude.

References

macrantha
Trees of Borneo
Endemic flora of Borneo
Plants described in 1929
Taxa named by Elmer Drew Merrill